Abdelkhalek Torres (1910 – May 27, 1970) was a Moroccan journalist and nationalist leader based in Tetouan, Morocco during the Spanish protectorate of Morocco era.

He co-founded an arabophone newspaper entitled al-Hurriya ( Freedom) along with Abdesalam Bennuna.

Torres's 1934 play Intissar al haq (The Victory of the Right), "is still considered the first published Moroccan play," according to scholar Kamal Salhi.

His political activity from the 1930s on culminated in the independence of Morocco in 1956. In his later years, Torres served first as ambassador to Spain and Egypt, and then as Minister of Justice.

References

1910 births
People from Tétouan
Moroccan male journalists
Moroccan nationalists
Moroccan writers
1970 deaths
Government ministers of Morocco
Ambassadors of Morocco to Spain
Ambassadors of Morocco to Egypt
20th-century journalists
Moriscos